Jägala may refer to:
Jägala, Estonia
Jägala River, a river which runs through Jägala
Jägala Waterfall, a waterfall along the river
Jägala concentration camp, a Nazi concentration camp
Kalevi-Liiva killing fields outside the camp
Jägala Army Base, a defunct Estonian Defence Forces base